The 2010–11 Fairfield Stags men's basketball team represented Fairfield University during the 2010–11 NCAA Division I men's basketball season. The Stags, led by 5th year head coach Ed Cooley, played their home games at Webster Bank Arena and are members of the Metro Atlantic Athletic Conference. The Stags finished the season 25–8, 15–3 in MAAC play and were MAAC regular season champions for the first time since 1986. They lost in the semifinals of the 2011 MAAC men's basketball tournament to Saint Peter's. As regular season champions who failed to win their conference tournament, they earned an automatic bid to the 2011 National Invitation Tournament where they defeated Colorado State in the first round before falling in the second round to Kent State.

Roster

Schedule

|-
!colspan=9| Exhibition

|-
!colspan=9| Regular season

|-
!colspan=9| MAAC tournament

|-
!colspan=9| 2011 NIT

References

Fairfield Stags men's basketball seasons
Fairfield
Fairfield
Fairfield Stags
Fairfield Stags